Chu–Qu Wu is a Southern Wu Chinese language spoken in Southern Zhejiang in Quzhou and Lishui prefectures, as well as some parts of Southern Wenzhou prefecture. It is also spoken in Shangrao and Yushan counties in Jiangxi province, and the northern part of Ningde and Nanping prefectures in Fujian province bordering Zhejiang. It is not mutually intelligible with Taihu Wu.

List of Chu–Qu Wu dialects
Quzhou dialect
Jiangshan dialect
Qingtian dialect
Lishui dialect

References 

Wu Chinese